Indian Creek Township is an inactive township in Monroe County, in the U.S. state of Missouri.

Indian Creek Township was established in 1840, taking its name from Indian Creek.

References

Townships in Missouri
Townships in Monroe County, Missouri